Victoria is on Athens Metro Line 1, between Omonia and Attiki. It is named after the British monarch Queen Victoria.

The station is underground, beneath Victoria Square, and was recently renovated. It is the first underground station of the northern group of Line 1 stations. The central station, Omonia, is also underground. The architectural style of the station is Art Deco and the walls are covered with light blue tiles in contrast with the tiles of the Omonia station, which are dark yellow.

Before and after the renovation, the station's name is shown in big white labels that were made in Germany by Emaillierwerk Gottfried Dichanz. The concept of the station is very similar to the stations in Berlin, the stairs in this concept go directly to the street.

Victoria station is at 5 minutes walking distance from the National Archaeological Museum of Athens and from Athens University of Economics and Business.

Citations

External links
 
 Information from Athens Piraeus Electric Railways

Art Deco railway stations
Athens Metro stations
Railway stations opened in 1948
1948 establishments in Greece